Eobaataridae is a family of fossil mammals within the order Multituberculata. Remains are known from the Lower Cretaceous of Europe and Asia. They are among the most derived representatives of the informal suborder "Plagiaulacida", and closely related to Cimolodonta. Most eobaatarids are only known from isolated teeth, though several reasonably complete members are known, including Sinobaatar and Jeholbaatar. The body of Sinobaatar is generalised, while Jeholbaatar displays clear adaptations for scansoriality (climbing) due to its elongated digits. Due to the morphology of the cheek teeth, Eobaatar and Jeholbaatar are inferred to be omnivorous, likely feeding on plants and invertebrates.

Indobaatar from the Early Jurassic Kota Formation has been suggested to be the earliest known multituberculate, let alone the earliest eobaatarid, and may stretch the eobaatarid-cimolodontan group much earlier than previously thought. However its referral to the family has been considered questionable by other scholars.

Fossils of Jeholbaatar kielanae seem to show that multituberculates independently acquired a middle ear from other mammal groups.

Etymology 
The name "Eobaatar" (from ancient Greek "ἠώς"= dawn and Mongolian "baatar"= hero)  means "dawn hero".

Notes

References 
 Kielan-Jaworowska, Dashzeveg & Trofimov (1987), "Early Cretaceous multituberculates from Mongolia and a comparison with Late Jurassic forms". Acta Palaeontologica Polonica 32, p. 3-47.

External links
 Most of this information has been derived from MESOZOIC MAMMALS: Plagiaulacidae, Albionbaataridae, Eobaataridae & Arginbaataridae

Multituberculates
Early Cretaceous extinctions
Prehistoric mammal families